Southside Township is a township in Kearny County, Kansas, USA.  As of the 2000 census, its population was 359.

Geography
Southside Township covers an area of 110.3 square miles (285.68 square kilometers); of this, 0.07 square miles (0.17 square kilometers) or 0.06 percent is water.

Adjacent townships
 Deerfield Township (north)
 Sherlock Township, Finney County (northeast)
 Ivanhoe Township, Finney County (east)
 Kendall Township (southwest)
 Hartland Township (northwest)
 Lakin Township (northwest)

Major highways
 K-25 (Kansas highway)

References
 U.S. Board on Geographic Names (GNIS)
 United States Census Bureau cartographic boundary files

External links
 US-Counties.com
 City-Data.com

Townships in Kearny County, Kansas
Townships in Kansas